Sebastian Wiese (born 12 January 1972 in Dresden, Bezirk Dresden) is a retired freestyle swimmer from Germany, who represented his native country at two consecutive Summer Olympics, starting in 1992. He won a bronze and a silver medal at the European Long Course Championships in the men's 1500 m freestyle in the early 1990s.

References
 

1972 births
Living people
Swimmers from Dresden
People from Bezirk Dresden
German male freestyle swimmers
Olympic swimmers of Germany
Swimmers at the 1992 Summer Olympics
Swimmers at the 1996 Summer Olympics
European Aquatics Championships medalists in swimming